Love Camp 7 is a 1969 American women-in-prison Nazisploitation B-movie directed by Lee Frost (credited as R.L. Frost) and written by Wes Bishop and Bob Cresse, the latter of whom also portrays a sadistic camp commandant.

Plot
Two American Women's Army Corps officers volunteer to enter a Nazi concentration camp undercover to gain information from, and possibly rescue, Martha Grossman, a Jewish scientist. The female inmates serve as sex slaves for German officers and are subjected to humiliating treatment, torture and rape.

When the two female agents learn that their target is being held in solitary detention, one of them arranges to be punished so that she can make contact. This leads to Lt. Harman being stripped and strung up by her wrists. The target uses her body to free Harman, and they attempt their escape. The escape plan ends in a climactic battle.

Cast
 Maria Lease as WAC Lt. Linda Harman
 Kathy Williams as WAC Lt. Grace Freeman
 Bob Cresse as Commandant
 Phil Poth
 John Aiderman as Capt. Robert Calais
 Carolyn Appleby as Blonde prisoner
 Dave Friedman as Col. Max Kemp
 Bruce Kimball as Sgt. Klaus Müller
 Rod Wilmouth as Col. Karl Müller
 Rodger Steel as Gen. Erich von Hamer
 Natasha Steel
 Patricia Roddy
 Lee Frost (uncredited) as Taxi driver

Reception
Love Camp 7 is regarded as a cult classic because it represents the beginning of a fashion for exploitation films about women in prison in the 1970s, such as Women in Cages (1971) and The Big Bird Cage (1972), both of which made Pam Grier a recognizable name in the genre. It is also the first in the Nazi exploitation (or Nazisploitation) genre of concentration camp movies, including Ilsa: She-Wolf of the SS (1974)–which was produced by David F. Friedman and led to several sequels with Dyanne Thorne as the titular character–and the Italian Nazi Love Camp 27 (1977) and Last Orgy of the Third Reich (1977), the latter of which helped launch Daniela Poggi's showbusiness career.

It was declined a video certificate by the British Board of Film Classification in 2002 and by the New Zealand Office of Film & Literature Classification. The BBFC upheld their rejection of the film when it was submitted for a certificate for streaming in 2020. It was originally banned in Australia, before passing several times in a modified version with an R18+ rating. It was finally passed uncut in 2005.

See also
 List of American films of 1969

References

External links
 
 
The Bad Movie Report: Love Camp 7 - sarcastic review of the plot

1969 films
1960s exploitation films
Nazi exploitation films
Women in prison films
Films directed by Lee Frost
Obscenity controversies in film
1960s prison films
1960s English-language films
American exploitation films
American prison films
American World War II films
1960s American films
Films originally rejected by the British Board of Film Classification